Trichilia florbranca is a species of plant in the family Meliaceae. It is endemic to Brazil.  It is threatened by habitat loss.

References

florbranca
Endemic flora of Brazil
Critically endangered plants
Critically endangered biota of South America
Taxonomy articles created by Polbot